Innertkirchen Unterwasser railway station is a railway station in the municipality of Innertkirchen, in the Swiss canton of Bern. It is located on the  Meiringen–Innertkirchen line of the Meiringen-Innertkirchen-Bahn (MIB). The station sits at the confluence of the Aare and  Gadmerwasser rivers.

Services 
 the following services stop at Innertkirchen Unterwasser:

References

External links 
 

Railway stations in the canton of Bern
Meiringen-Innertkirchen-Bahn stations